

Events

Pre-1600
1294 – Saint Celestine V resigns the papacy after only five months to return to his previous life as an ascetic hermit.
1545 – The Council of Trent begins as the embodiment of the Counter-Reformation.
1577 – Sir Francis Drake sets sail from Plymouth, England, on his round-the-world voyage.

1601–1900
1623 – The Plymouth Colony establishes the system of trial by 12-men jury in the American colonies.
1636 – The Massachusetts Bay Colony organizes three militia regiments to defend the colony against the Pequot Indians, a date now considered the founding of the National Guard of the United States.
1642 – Abel Tasman is the first recorded European to sight New Zealand.
1643 – English Civil War: The Battle of Alton takes place in Hampshire.
1758 – The English transport ship Duke William sinks in the North Atlantic, killing over 360 people.
1769 – Dartmouth College is founded by the Reverend Eleazar Wheelock, with a royal charter from King George III, on land donated by Royal governor John Wentworth.
1818 – Cyril VI of Constantinople resigns from his position as Ecumenical Patriarch under pressure from the Ottoman Empire.
1862 – American Civil War: At the Battle of Fredericksburg, Confederate General Robert E. Lee defeats Union Major General Ambrose Burnside.
1867 – A Fenian bomb explodes in Clerkenwell, London, killing 12 people and injuring 50.

1901–present
1937 – Second Sino-Japanese War: Battle of Nanking: The city of Nanjing, defended by the National Revolutionary Army under the command of General Tang Shengzhi, falls to the Japanese. This is followed by the Nanking Massacre, in which Japanese troops rape and slaughter hundreds of thousands of civilians.
1938 – The Holocaust: The Neuengamme concentration camp opens in the Bergedorf district of Hamburg, Germany.
1939 – The Battle of the River Plate is fought off the coast of Uruguay; the first naval battle of World War II.
1943 – World War II: The Massacre of Kalavryta by German occupying forces in Greece.
1949 – The Knesset votes to move the capital of Israel from Tel Aviv to Jerusalem.
1957 – The  6.5 Farsinaj earthquake strikes Iran with a maximum Mercalli intensity of VII, causing at least 1,119 deaths and damaging over 5,000 homes.
1959 – Archbishop Makarios III becomes the first President of Cyprus.
1960 – While Emperor Haile Selassie of Ethiopia visits Brazil, his Imperial Bodyguard seizes the capital and proclaims him deposed and his son, Crown Prince Asfa Wossen, Emperor.
1962 – NASA launches Relay 1, the first active repeater communications satellite in orbit.
1967 – Constantine II of Greece attempts an unsuccessful counter-coup against the Regime of the Colonels.
1968 – Brazilian President Artur da Costa e Silva issues AI-5 (Institutional Act No. 5), enabling government by decree and suspending habeas corpus.
1972 – Apollo program: Eugene Cernan and Harrison Schmitt begin the third and final extra-vehicular activity (EVA) or "Moonwalk" of Apollo 17. To date they are the last humans to set foot on the Moon.
1974 – Malta becomes a republic within the Commonwealth of Nations.
  1974   – In the Vietnam War, the North Vietnamese forces launch their 1975 Spring Offensive (to 30 April 1975), which results in the final capitulation of South Vietnam.
1977 – Air Indiana Flight 216 crashes near Evansville Regional Airport, killing 29, including the University of Evansville basketball team, support staff, and boosters of the team.
1981 – General Wojciech Jaruzelski declares martial law in Poland, largely due to the actions by Solidarity.
1982 – The 6.0  North Yemen earthquake shakes southwestern Yemen with a maximum Mercalli intensity of VIII (Severe), killing 2,800, and injuring 1,500.
1988 – PLO Chairman Yasser Arafat gives a speech at a UN General Assembly meeting in Geneva, Switzerland, after United States authorities refused to grant him a visa to visit UN headquarters in New York.
1989 – The Troubles: Attack on Derryard checkpoint: The Provisional Irish Republican Army launches an attack on a British Army temporary vehicle checkpoint near Rosslea, Northern Ireland. Two British soldiers are killed and two others are wounded.
1994 – Flagship Airlines Flight 3379 crashes in Morrisville, North Carolina, near Raleigh–Durham International Airport, killing 15.
1995 – Banat Air Flight 166 crashes in Sommacampagna near Verona Villafranca Airport in Verona, Italy, killing 49.
2001 – Sansad Bhavan, the building housing the Indian Parliament, is attacked by terrorists. Twelve people are killed, including the terrorists.
2002 – European Union enlargement: The EU announces that Cyprus, Czechia, Estonia, Hungary, Latvia, Lithuania, Malta, Poland, Slovakia, and Slovenia will become members on May 1, 2004.
2003 – Iraq War: Operation Red Dawn: Former Iraqi President Saddam Hussein is captured near his home town of Tikrit.
2007 – The Treaty of Lisbon is signed by the EU member states to amend both the Treaty of Rome and the Maastricht Treaty which together form the constitutional basis of the EU. The Treaty of Lisbon is effective from 1 December 2009.

Births

Pre-1600
1272 – King Frederick III of Sicily (d. 1337)
1363 – Jean Gerson, chancellor of the University of Paris (d. 1429)
1476 – Lucy Brocadelli, Dominican tertiary and stigmatic (d. 1544)
1484 – Paul Speratus, German Lutheran (d. 1551)
1491 – Martín de Azpilcueta, Spanish theologian and economist (d. 1586)
1499 – Justus Menius, German Lutheran pastor (d. 1558)
1521 – Pope Sixtus V (d. 1590)
1533 – Eric XIV of Sweden (d. 1577)
1553 – Henry IV of France (d. 1610)
1560 – Maximilien de Béthune, Duke of Sully, 2nd Prime Minister of France (d. 1641)
1585 – William Drummond of Hawthornden, Scottish poet (d. 1649)

1601–1900
1640 – Robert Plot, English chemist and academic (d. 1696)
1662 – Francesco Bianchini, Italian astronomer and philosopher (d. 1729)
1678 – Yongzheng Emperor of China (d. 1735)
1720 – Carlo Gozzi, Italian playwright (d. 1804)
1724 – Franz Aepinus, German astronomer and philosopher (d. 1802)
1769 – James Scarlett Abinger, English judge (d. 1844)
1780 – Johann Wolfgang Döbereiner, German chemist, invented the Döbereiner's lamp (d. 1849)
1784 – Archduke Louis of Austria (d. 1864)
1797 – Heinrich Heine, German journalist, poet, and critic (d. 1856)
1804 – Joseph Howe, Canadian journalist and politician, 5th Premier of Nova Scotia (d. 1873)
1814 – Ana Néri, Brazilian nurse and philanthropist (d. 1880)
1816 – Werner von Siemens, German engineer and businessman, founded Siemens (d. 1892)
1818 – Mary Todd Lincoln, 16th First Lady of the United States (d. 1882)
1830 – Mathilde Fibiger, Danish feminist, novelist and telegraphist (d. 1892)
1836 – Franz von Lenbach, German painter and academic (d. 1904)
1854 – Herman Bavinck, Dutch philosopher, theologian, and academic (d. 1921)
1856 – Svetozar Boroević, Croatian-Austrian field marshal (d. 1920)
1860 – Lucien Guitry, French actor (d. 1925)
1864 – Emil Seidel, American woodcarver and politician, 36th Mayor of Milwaukee (d. 1947)
1867 – Kristian Birkeland, Norwegian physicist and author (d. 1917)
1870 – Edward LeSaint, American actor and director (d. 1940)
1871 – Emily Carr, Canadian painter and author (d. 1945)
1874 – Josef Lhévinne, Russian pianist and educator (d. 1944)
1882 – Jane Edna Hunter, African-American social worker (d. 1971)
1883 – Belle da Costa Greene, American librarian and bibliographer (d. 1950)
1884 – Aimilios Veakis, Greek actor, director, and playwright (d. 1951)
1885 – Annie Dale Biddle Andrews, American mathematician (d. 1940)
1887 – George Pólya, Hungarian-American mathematician and academic (d. 1985)
  1887   – Alvin C. York, American colonel, Medal of Honor recipient (d. 1964)
1897 – Albert Aalbers, Dutch architect, designed the Savoy Homann Bidakara Hotel (d. 1961)
  1897   – Drew Pearson, American journalist and author (d. 1969)
1900 – Jonel Perlea, Romanian-American conductor and educator (d. 1970)

1901–present
1901 – Olev Roomet, Estonian singer, violinist, and bagpipe player (d. 1987)
1902 – Panagiotis Kanellopoulos, Greek philosopher and politician, 138th Prime Minister of Greece (d. 1986)
  1902   – Talcott Parsons, American sociologist and academic (d. 1979)
1903 – Ella Baker, American activist (d. 1986)
  1903   – Carlos Montoya, Spanish guitarist and composer (d. 1993)
1905 – Ann Barzel, American writer and dance critic (d. 2007)
1906 – Princess Marina of Greece and Denmark (d. 1968)
  1906   – Laurens van der Post, South African-English soldier and author (d. 1996)
1908 – Plinio Corrêa de Oliveira, Brazilian historian and activist (d. 1995)
  1908   – Van Heflin, American film actor (d. 1971)
  1908   – Elizabeth Alexander, British geologist, academic, and physicist (d. 1958)
1911 – Trygve Haavelmo, Norwegian economist and mathematician, Nobel Prize laureate (d. 1999)
  1911   – Kenneth Patchen, American poet and painter (d. 1972)
1912 – Luiz Gonzaga, Brazilian singer-songwriter and accordion player (d. 1989)
1913 – Archie Moore, American boxer and actor; world light-heavyweight champion (d. 1998)
  1913   – Arnold Brown, English-Canadian missionary, 11th General of The Salvation Army (d. 2002)
 1913 – Susanne Suba, Hungarian-born watercolorist and illustrator, active in the United States (d. 2012)
1914 – Alan Bullock, English historian and author (d. 2004)
  1914   – Larry Noble, English comedian and actor (d. 1993)
1915 – B. J. Vorster, South African lawyer and politician, 4th State President of South Africa (d. 1983)
1916 – Leonard Weisgard, American author and illustrator (d. 2000)
1919 – Hans-Joachim Marseille, German captain and pilot (d. 1942)
1920 – George P. Shultz, American economist and politician, 60th United States Secretary of State (d. 2021)
1921 – Turgut Demirağ, Turkish film producer, director and screenwriter (d. 1987)
1923 – Philip Warren Anderson, American physicist and academic, Nobel Prize laureate (d. 2020)
  1923   – Larry Doby, American baseball player (d. 2003)
1925 – Dick Van Dyke, American actor, singer, and dancer
1927 – James Wright, American poet and academic (d. 1980)
1929 – Christopher Plummer, Canadian actor and producer (d. 2021)
1934 – Richard D. Zanuck, American film producer (d. 2012) 
  1934   – Antoinette Rodez Schiesler, American chemist (d. 1996)
1935 – Türkan Saylan, Turkish physician and academic (d. 2009)
1936 – Prince Karim al-Husayn Shāh, Aga Khan IV, Swiss humanitarian and religious leader
1938 – Gus Johnson, American basketball player; elected to Hall of Fame in 2010 (d. 1987)
1940 – Sanjaya Lall, Indian economist and academic (d. 2005)
1942 – Howard Brenton, English playwright and screenwriter
  1942   – Ferguson Jenkins, Canadian baseball player
1948 – Jeff Baxter, American guitarist, songwriter, and producer
  1948   – Lillian Board, British athlete; European champion at 400m and 800m (d. 1970)
  1948   – Ted Nugent, American musician
1950 – Wendie Malick, American actress
1953 – Ben Bernanke, American economist
1957 – Steve Buscemi, American actor and director
  1957   – Morris Day, American musician and actor
1960 – Richard Dent, American pro football player (NFL); MVP of Super Bowl XX; elected to Hall of Fame in 2011
1962 – Rex Ryan, American football coach and analyst
1964 – Krišjānis Kariņš, American-born Latvian politician, 23rd Prime Minister of Latvia
1967 – Jamie Foxx, American actor, singer, songwriter, producer, and comedian
1975 – Tom DeLonge, American singer-songwriter, guitarist, author, and filmmaker
1978 – Cameron Douglas, American actor
1981 – Amy Lee, American singer, songwriter and pianist; co-founder and lead vocalist of Evanescence
1984 – Santi Cazorla, Spanish international footballer
  1984   – Hanna-Maria Seppälä, Finnish freestyle swimmer; 2003 world champion in the 100 m freestyle
1988 – Rickie Fowler, American Ryder Cup golfer on the PGA Tour; three-time runner-up in major tournaments
1989 – Hellen Obiri, Kenyan runner; twice world champion in the 5000 metres event
  1989   – Katherine Schwarzenegger, American author
  1989   – Taylor Swift, American singer-songwriter
1990 – Fletcher Cox, American football player
  1990   – Arantxa Rus, Dutch tennis player
1991 – Dave Leduc, Lethwei World Champion
1993 – Danielle Collins, American tennis player
1995 – Emma Corrin, English actor
1999 – Marina Bassols Ribera, Spanish tennis player
2000 – Simona Waltert, Swiss tennis player

Deaths

Pre-1600
 558 – Childebert I, Frankish king (b. 496)
 769 – Du Hongjian, Chinese politician (b. 709)
 838 – Pepin I of Aquitaine (b. 797)
 859 – Angilbert II, archbishop of Milan
1124 – Pope Callixtus II (b. 1065)
1126 – Henry IX, Duke of Bavaria (b. 1075)
1204 – Maimonides, Spanish rabbi and philosopher (b. 1135)
1250 – Frederick II, Holy Roman Emperor (b. 1194)
1272 – Bertold of Regensburg, German preacher
1404 – Albert I, Duke of Bavaria (b. 1336)
1466 – Donatello, Italian painter and sculptor (b. 1386)
1516 – Johannes Trithemius, German cryptographer and historian (b. 1462)
1521 – Manuel I of Portugal (b. 1469)
1557 – Niccolò Fontana Tartaglia, Italian mathematician and engineer (b. 1499)
1565 – Conrad Gessner, Swiss botanist and physician (b. 1516)

1601–1900
1621 – Katarina Stenbock, queen of Gustav I of Sweden (b. 1535)
1671 – Antonio Grassi, Italian Roman Catholic priest(b. 1592)
1716 – Charles de La Fosse, French painter (b. 1640)
1721 – Alexander Selkirk, Scottish sailor (b. 1676)
1729 – Anthony Collins, English philosopher and author (b. 1676)
1754 – Mahmud I, Ottoman sultan (b. 1696)
1758 – Noël Doiron, Canadian Acadia leader (b. 1684)
1769 – Christian Fürchtegott Gellert, German poet and hymn-writer  (b. 1715)
1783 – Pehr Wilhelm Wargentin, Swedish astronomer and demographer (b. 1717)
1784 – Samuel Johnson, English poet and lexicographer (b. 1709)
1814 – Charles-Joseph, 7th Prince of Ligne, Belgian-Austrian field marshal (b. 1735)
1849 – Johann Centurius Hoffmannsegg, German botanist and entomologist (b. 1766)
1862 – Thomas Reade Rootes Cobb, American general, lawyer, and politician (b. 1823)
1863 – Christian Friedrich Hebbel, German poet and playwright (b. 1813)
1868 – Carl Friedrich Philipp von Martius, German botanist and explorer (b. 1794)
1881 – August Šenoa, Croatian author and poet (b. 1838)
1883 – Victor de Laprade, French poet and critic (b. 1812)
1893 – Georg August Rudolph, German lawyer and politician, 3rd Mayor of Marburg (b. 1816)
1895 – Ányos Jedlik, Hungarian physicist and engineer (b. 1800)

1901–present
1908 – Augustus Le Plongeon, French photographer and historian (b. 1825)
1919 – Woldemar Voigt, German physicist and academic (b. 1850)
1922 – Arthur Wesley Dow, American painter and photographer (b. 1857)
  1922   – Hannes Hafstein, Icelandic poet and politician, 1st Prime Minister of Iceland (b. 1861)
1924 – Samuel Gompers, English-born American labor leader, founded the American Federation of Labor (b. 1850)
1927 – Mehmet Nadir, Turkish mathematician and academic (b. 1856)
1929 – Rosina Heikel, Finnish physician (b. 1842)
1930 – Fritz Pregl, Slovenian-Austrian chemist and physician, Nobel Prize laureate (b. 1869)
1931 – Gustave Le Bon, French psychologist, sociologist, and anthropologist (b. 1840)
1932 – Georgios Jakobides, Greek painter and sculptor (b. 1853)
1935 – Victor Grignard, French chemist and academic, Nobel Prize laureate (b. 1871)
1942 – Wlodimir Ledóchowski, Austrian-Polish religious leader, 26th Superior-General of the Society of Jesus (b. 1866)
  1942   – Robert Robinson Taylor, American architect (b. 1868)
1944 – Wassily Kandinsky, Russian-French painter and theorist (b. 1866)
1945 – Irma Grese, German concentration camp guard (b. 1923)
  1945   – Josef Kramer, German concentration camp commandant (b. 1906)
  1945   – Elisabeth Volkenrath, Polish-German concentration camp supervisor (b. 1919)
1947 – Henry James, American lawyer and author (b. 1879)
  1947   – Nicholas Roerich, Russian archaeologist, painter, and philosopher (b. 1874)
1950 – Abraham Wald, Hungarian mathematician and academic (b. 1902)
1954 – John Raymond Hubbell, American director and composer (b. 1879)
1955 – Egas Moniz, Portuguese psychiatrist and neurosurgeon, Nobel Prize laureate (b. 1874)
1960 – Dora Marsden, English author and activist (b. 1882)
1961 – Grandma Moses, American painter (b. 1860)
1962 – Harry Barris, American singer-songwriter and pianist  (b. 1905)
1969 – Raymond A. Spruance, American admiral and diplomat, United States Ambassador to the Philippines (b. 1886)
1973 – Henry Green, English author (b. 1905)
1974 – Yakup Kadri Karaosmanoglu, Egyptian-Turkish journalist, author, and politician (b. 1889)
1975 – Cyril Delevanti, English-American actor (b. 1889)
1977 – Oguz Atay, Turkish engineer and author (b. 1934)
1979 – Jon Hall, American actor and director (b. 1915)
  1979   – Behçet Necatigil, Turkish author, poet and translator (b. 1916)
1983 – Alexander Schmemann, Estonian-American priest and theologian (b. 1921)
  1983   – Nichita Stănescu, Romanian poet and critic (b. 1933)
1986 – Heather Angel, British-American actress (b. 1909)
  1986   – Ella Baker, American activist (b. 1903)
  1986   – Smita Patil, Indian actress and journalist (b. 1955)
1992 – K. C. Irving, Canadian businessman (b. 1899)
  1992   – Cornelius Vanderbilt Whitney, American businessman and philanthropist (b. 1899)
1993 – Vanessa Duriès, French author (b. 1972)
1995 – Ann Nolan Clark, American author and educator (b. 1896)
1996 – Edward Blishen, English author and educator (b. 1920)
1997 – Don E. Fehrenbacher, American historian, author, and academic (b. 1920)
1998 – Lew Grade, Ukrainian-born British impresario and media proprietor (b. 1906)
  1998   – Richard Thomas, Royal Naval Officer (b. 1922)
  1998   – Wade Watts, civil rights activist (b. 1919)
2002 – Zal Yanovsky, Canadian singer-songwriter and guitarist who founded The Lovin' Spoonful (b. 1944)
2004 – David Wheeler, English computer scientist and academic (b. 1927)
2005 – Alan Shields, American painter and ferryboat captain (b. 1944) 
2006 – Lamar Hunt, American businessman, co-founded the American Football League and World Championship Tennis (b. 1932)
2016 – Alan Thicke, Canadian actor, songwriter, game and talk-show host (b. 1947)
2018 – Noah Klieger, Holocaust survivor who became an award-winning Israeli journalist (b. 1926)
2022 – Stephen "tWitch" Boss, American dancer and media personality (b. 1982)

Holidays and observances

 Christian feast day:
 St Antiochus of Sulcis
 St Judoc aka St Joyce
 St Lucy
 St Odile of Alsace
 Acadian Remembrance Day (Acadians)
 National Day (Saint Lucia)
 Martial Law Victims Remembrance Day (Poland)
 Nanking Massacre Memorial Day (China)
 Nusantara Day (Indonesia)
 Republic Day (Malta)
 Sailor's Day (Brazil)
 Saint Lucia Day (mainly in Scandinavia)

References

External links

 BBC: On This Day
 
 Historical Events on December 13

Days of the year
December